Hovak Galoyan (born August 1, 1963), is an Armenian actor. In 2014, Galoyan was awarded with the title of Honored Artist of Armenia upon the decree of Armenian president Serzh Sargsyan.

External links

References

1973 births
Living people
21st-century Armenian male actors
20th-century Armenian male actors
Male actors from Yerevan
Honored artists of Armenia